The African leopard (Panthera pardus pardus) is the nominate subspecies of the leopard, native to many countries in Africa. It is widely distributed in most of sub-Saharan Africa, but the historical range has been fragmented in the course of habitat conversion. Leopards have also been recorded in North Africa as well.

Taxonomy 

Felis pardus was the scientific name used by Carl Linnaeus in the 10th edition of Systema Naturae in 1758. His description was based on descriptions by earlier naturalists such as Conrad Gessner. He assumed that the leopard occurred in India.
In the 18th and 19th centuries, several naturalists described various leopard skins and skulls from Africa, including:
 Felis pardus panthera proposed by Johann Christian Daniel von Schreber in 1778 based on descriptions by earlier naturalists
 Felis leopardus var. melanotica by Albert Günther in 1885 from the Cape of Good Hope, Southern Africa
 Felis leopardus suahelicus by Oscar Neumann in 1900 from the Tanganyika territory
 Felis leopardus nanopardus by Oldfield Thomas in 1904 from Italian Somaliland
 Felis pardus ruwenzorii by Lorenzo Camerano in 1906 from the Ruwenzori and Virunga Mountains
 Felis pardus chui by Edmund Heller in 1913 from Uganda
 Felis pardus iturensis by Joel Asaph Allen in 1924 from the Belgian Congo
 Felis pardus reichenowi by Ángel Cabrera in 1927 from Cameroon
 Panthera pardus adusta by Reginald Innes Pocock in 1927 from the Ethiopian Highlands
 Panthera pardus adersi by Pocock in 1932 from Unguja Island, Zanzibar
 Panthera pardus brockmani  by Pocock in 1932 from Somaliland

Results of genetic analyses indicate that all African leopard populations are generally closely related and represent only one subspecies, namely P. p. pardus. However, results of an analysis of molecular variance and the pairwise fixation index of African leopard museum specimens shows differences in the ND-5 locus spanning five major haplogroups, namely in Central–Southern Africa, Southern Africa, West Africa, coastal West–Central Africa, and Central–East Africa. In some cases, fixation indices showed higher diversity than for the Arabian leopard and Panthera pardus tulliana in Asia.

Characteristics

The African leopard exhibits great variation in coat color, depending on location and habitat. Coat colour varies from pale yellow to deep gold or tawny, and sometimes black, and is patterned with black rosettes while the head, lower limbs and belly are spotted with solid black. Male leopards are larger, averaging  with  being the maximum weight attained by a male.

The African leopard is sexually dimorphic; males are larger and heavier than females. Between 1996 and 2000, 11 adult leopards were radio-collared on Namibian farmlands. Males weighed  only, and females .

According to Alfred Edward Pease, black leopards in North Africa were similar in size to lions.

Leopards inhabiting the mountains of the Cape Provinces appear smaller and less heavy than leopards further north. Leopards in Somalia and Ethiopia are also said to be smaller.

Distribution and habitat 

The African leopards inhabited a wide range of habitats within Africa, from mountainous forests to grasslands and savannahs, excluding only extremely sandy desert. It is most at risk in areas of semi-desert, where scarce resources often result in conflict with nomadic farmers and their livestock.

It used to occur in most of sub-Saharan Africa, occupying both rainforest and arid desert habitats. It lived in all habitats with annual rainfall above , and can penetrate areas with less than this amount of rainfall along river courses.

It appears to be successful at adapting to altered natural habitat and settled environments in the absence of intense persecution. It has often been recorded close to major cities. But already in the 1980s, it has become rare throughout much of West Africa. Now, it remains patchily distributed within historical limits. During surveys in 2013, it was recorded in Gbarpolu County and Bong County in the Upper Guinean forests of Liberia.

Leopards are rare in North Africa.

In 2014, a leopard was killed in the Elba Protected Area in southeastern Egypt. This was the first sighting of a leopard in the country since the 1950s.

In 2016, a leopard was recorded for the first time in a semi-arid area of Yechilay in northern Ethiopia.

Behavior and ecology 
In Kruger National Park, male leopards and female leopards with cubs were more active at night than solitary females. The highest rates of daytime activity were recorded for leopards using thorn thickets during the wet season, when impala also used them. Leopards are generally most active between sunset and sunrise, and kill more prey at this time.

Diet and hunting 

The leopard has an exceptional ability to adapt to changes in prey availability, and has a very broad diet. It takes small prey where large ungulates are less common. The known prey of leopards ranges from dung beetles to adult elands, which can reach . In sub-Saharan Africa, at least 92 prey species have been documented in leopard scat, including rodents, birds, small and large antelopes, hyraxes, hares, and arthropods. Leopards generally focus their hunting activity on locally abundant medium-sized ungulates in the  range, while opportunistically taking other prey. Average intervals between ungulate kills range from seven to 12–13 days.
Leopards often hide large kills in trees, a behavior for which great strength is required.

In Serengeti National Park, leopards were radio-collared for the first time in the early 1970s. Their hunting at night was difficult to watch; the best time for observing them was after dawn. Of their 64 daytime hunts, only three were successful. In this woodland area, they preyed mostly on impalas, both adult and young, and caught some Thomson's gazelles in the dry season. Occasionally, they successfully hunted warthogs, dik-diks, reedbucks, duikers, steenboks, blue wildebeest and topi calves, jackals, Cape hares, guineafowl and starlings. They were less successful in hunting plains zebras, Coke's hartebeests, giraffes, mongooses, genets, hyraxes and small birds. Scavenging from the carcasses of large animals made up a small proportion of their food. In the tropical rainforests of Central Africa, their diet consists of duikers and primates. Some individual leopards have shown a strong preference for pangolins and porcupines.

In North Africa, the leopard preys on Barbary macaques (Macaca sylvanus).
Analysis of leopard scat in Taï National Park revealed that primates are primary leopard prey during the day.
In Gabon's Lope National Park, the most important prey species was found to be the red river hog (Potamochoerus porcus). African buffaloes (Syncerus caffer) and cane rats (Thryonomys swinderianus), comprised 13% each of the consumed biomass.

In the Central African Republic's Dzanga-Sangha Complex of Protected Areas, a leopard reportedly attacked and pursued a large western lowland gorilla, but did not catch it. Gorilla parts found in leopard scat indicates that the leopard either scavenged on gorilla remains or killed it. African leopards were observed preying on adult eastern gorillas in the Kisoro area near Uganda's borders with Rwanda and the Democratic Republic of the Congo.

Threats 

Throughout Africa, the major threats to leopards are habitat conversion and intense persecution, especially in retribution for real and perceived livestock loss.
The Upper Guinean forests in Liberia are considered a biodiversity hotspot, but have already been fragmented into two blocks. Large tracts are affected by commercial logging and mining activities, and are converted for agricultural use including large-scale oil palm plantations in concessions obtained by a foreign company.

The impact of trophy hunting on populations is unclear, but may have impacts at the demographic and population level, especially when females are shot. In Tanzania, only males are allowed to be hunted, but females comprised 28.6% of 77 trophies shot between 1995 and 1998. Removing an excessively high number of males may produce a cascade of deleterious effects on the population. Although male leopards provide no parental care to cubs, the presence of the sire allows females to raise cubs with a reduced risk of infanticide by other males. There are few reliable observations of infanticide in leopards, but new males entering the population are likely to kill existing cubs.

Analysis of leopard scats and camera trapping surveys in contiguous forest landscapes in the Congo Basin revealed a high dietary niche overlap and an exploitative competition between leopards and bushmeat hunters. With increasing proximity to settlements and concomitant human hunting pressure, leopards exploit smaller prey and occur at considerably reduced population densities. In the presence of intensive bushmeat hunting surrounding human settlements, leopards appear entirely absent.
Transhumant pastoralists from the border area between Sudan and the Central African Republic take their livestock to the Chinko area. They are accompanied by armed merchants who engage in poaching large herbivores, sale of bushmeat and trading leopard skins in Am Dafok. Surveys in the area revealed that the leopard population decreased from 97 individuals in 2012 to 50 individuals in 2017. Rangers confiscated large amounts of poison in the camps of livestock herders, who admitted that they use it for poisoning predators.

Conservation 
The leopard is listed in CITES Appendix I. Hunting is banned in Zambia and Botswana, and was suspended in South Africa for 2016.

Leopard populations are present in several protected areas, including:
Taï National Park
Etosha National Park
Virunga National Park
Kruger National Park

See also 

Leopard subspecies
Chinese leopard
Zanzibar leopard

References

External links 

 Species portrait African leopard; IUCN/SSC Cat Specialist Group
 Leopards .:. wild-cat.org — Information about research and conservation of leopards
 The Cape Leopard Trust, South Africa
 Safarinow.com: African Leopard » Panthera pardus » 'Luiperd'
 South Africa Wildlife: Leopard {Panthera Pardus}
 Image of a leopard from the Central African forests of Gabon (archived 14 January 2014)
 Video of the Barbary Leopard in the wild (broken link) (archived 20 February 2010)
 Predation on a child at Queen Elizabeth National Park, Uganda

African leopard
African leopard
Taxa named by Carl Linnaeus
Mammals of Sub-Saharan Africa